The NAIA Men's Volleyball Championship is an annual tournament hosted by the National Association of Intercollegiate Athletics to determine the national champion of collegiate men's volleyball among its members in the United States.

The inaugural championship was held in 2019.

The reigning national champions are Grand View, who won their second title in 2022.

Results

Champions

See also
NCAA Men's Volleyball Championships (Divisions I and II, Division III)
NAIA Women's Volleyball Championship

References

External links
NAIA Men's Volleyball

Volleyball